= Pleistomollusca =

Scientific classification
- Domain: Eukaryota
- Kingdom: Animalia
- Phylum: Mollusca
- Clade: Pleistomollusca; Kocot et al, 2011

Clade of molluscs

The Pleistomollusca is a proposed clade within the Mollusca. The clade unites the gastropods with the bivalves, the two groups together representing 95% of known molluscan species. The support for this clade is based mainly on molecular analyses, although some morphological synapomorphies have also been proposed: larval retractor muscles, a velum muscle ring, and perhaps the loss of the anterior ciliary rootlet in their locomotory cilia.
